"Glamorous Sky" is Mika Nakashima's 16th single overall, her 1st under the name Nana starring Mika Nakashima, and the second most successful single in her career after "Stars". It is her first rock song and it was used as one of the image songs for the film Nana (as one of the bands Black Stones' song). Hyde of L'Arc-en-Ciel composed "Glamorous Sky". The second and third B-sides, "Blood" and "Isolation" were used as CM songs for Kate cosmetics. Mika Nakashima graces the cover of the single as Nana Osaki. The song is featured as a cover by a jrock band, Girugamesh, in the Konami music games, BEMANI for Drummania V3 and Guitarfreaks V3, as well as the iNiS rhythm game Moero! Nekketsu Rhythm Damashii Osu! Tatakae! Ouendan 2.

Track list

CD

Vinyl

TV performances
2005-11-21 – Best Hit Kayousai 2005
2005-11-30 – NTV's Best Artist
2005-12-07 – FNS Kayousai
2005-12-23 – Music Station
2005-12-31 – CDTV 
2005-12-31 – Japan Record Awards

Charts
This is Nakashima's only single to debut at #1 on the Oricon weekly charts. It stayed at #1 in the daily charts for two entire weeks, which none of her other singles have achieved. "Glamorous Sky" sold 120,202 units for its first week, outselling the #2 single of the week from w-inds by 72,993 units. In the second week it was also #1, with the #2 spot being occupied by her Nana co-star Yuna Ito and her single, "Endless Story"; the latter would eventually outsell "Glamorous Sky" in 2006 Overall, "Glamorous Sky" has sold 444,067 copies since release and has charted in the Oricon charts for 28 weeks. It managed to reach #10 in the 2005 Oricon year end charts, the highest position for a female artist on those charts that year.

Oricon Sales Chart (Japan)

References 

Oricon Weekly number-one singles
2005 singles
2005 songs
Japanese film songs
Mika Nakashima songs
Songs written by Hyde (musician)
Sony Music Associated Records singles